Humberto Luiz Gomes da Silva, also known simply as Humberto (born February 7, 1995), is a Brazilian professional basketball player for Corinthians of the Novo Basquete Brasil (NBB) from Brazil.

Professional career

Flamengo
On 7 July 2016, Flamengo announced the signings of Humberto and Ricardo Fischer, as part of the club's new signings for the NBB's 2016–17 NBB.

NBB career statistics

Regular season

Playoffs

References

External links
 Latinbasket.com Profile
 NBB Player Profile 

1995 births
Living people
Brazilian men's basketball players
Esporte Clube Pinheiros basketball players
Flamengo basketball players
Novo Basquete Brasil players
Point guards
Shooting guards
Sport Club Corinthians Paulista basketball players
Basketball players from São Paulo